Toshiko Akiyoshi in Japan (also released as Long Yellow Road, Toshiko Akiyoshi Quartet) is an album by pianist Toshiko Akiyoshi, recorded at the Osaka Expo Hall in Osaka, Japan in 1970 and released by Toshiba Records.   It is not to be confused with other similarly titled releases by the Toshiko Akiyoshi Trio and the Toshiko Akiyoshi - Lew Tabackin Big Band.

Track listing 
LP side A
"Opus No. Zero" (Akiyoshi) – 8:33
"Sweet and Lovely" (Arnheim) – 12:56
LP side B
"Long Yellow Road" (Akiyoshi) – 17:48

Personnel
Toshiko Akiyoshi – piano
Lew Tabackin – tenor saxophone, flute
Bob Daugherty – bass
Mickey Roker – drums

References / External links
Toshiba LPC-8049
Toshiba TOCT-9361
Toshiba ETJ-65009
Toshiba / EMI CA32-1440

Toshiko Akiyoshi live albums
1970 live albums